Albert John "Alby" Schultz (29 May 193914 July 2015) was an Australian politician. He was a Liberal member of the Australian House of Representatives from October 1998 to August 2013, representing the Division of Hume in New South Wales.

Biography

Early life
Schultz was born in Melbourne, Victoria, and was a meat processing worker before entering politics. He was a field officer for the Liberal Party (1986–88) and a member of the Cootamundra Shire Council (1983–91).

Career
Schultz was the member for Burrinjuck in the New South Wales Legislative Assembly from 1988 to 1998, before being elected to represent Hume at the 1998 federal election. He was subsequently returned at the 2001, 2004, 2007 and 2010 elections. He gained national media attention in the lead up to the privatisation of Telstra claiming that he would not support the legislation but would not "cross the floor". In the end he abstained from voting on the matter.

Schultz was initially a supporter of Prime Minister John Howard but as a result of being overlooked for promotion by Howard, Schultz in 2005 changed his allegiance to Howard's heir apparent Peter Costello.

However a year later in 2006, Schultz accused Costello of disloyalty to Howard following the revelation of a deal of when Howard would hand over the Prime Ministership to Costello.

Alby Schultz was one of the several Liberal Party politicians along with Don Randall, Wilson Tuckey, Concetta Fierravanti-Wells, Dennis Jensen and Sophie Mirabella, who boycotted Parliament on the day that the formal apology to the Stolen Generations was made by Prime Minister Kevin Rudd.

Schultz apologised in June 2009 for a physical confrontation with one of his Liberal parliamentary colleagues in a party room meeting in Parliament House. He had been angered by a remark made by Chris Pearce, the member for Aston in Victoria, during a debate about whether the Liberal Party should run candidates against National Party MPs. Schultz reportedly responded by grabbing Pearce around the neck. He later apologised to Pearce and the entire party room for the incident.

In September 2012 he prompted an investigation by the Department of Parliamentary Service about a "serious security breach" when he became aware his private calendar became accessible on other MP's computers. The investigation determined that his own office was responsible for the error when configuring the email service, by nominating access to multiple users.

Schultz retired at the 2013 Australian federal election.

In 2015 he was listed as patron of the anti-wind farm lobby, the Waubra Foundation.

Personal
In 2003 he lost an eye in an accident with hydrochloric acid while cleaning a swimming pool filter, and in 2004 received a prosthetic eye.

Schultz was a staunch monarchist and long fought against the movement to make Australia a republic.

Not long after his retirement, in May 2013, Schultz was diagnosed with inoperable liver and oesophageal cancer. Two months before the diagnosis, it was revealed he had prostate cancer. He died on 14 July 2015, aged 76.

References

External links 
 Personal website

1939 births
2015 deaths
Australian monarchists
Liberal Party of Australia members of the Parliament of Australia
New South Wales local councillors
Australian people of German descent
Members of the Australian House of Representatives
Members of the Australian House of Representatives for Hume
Members of the New South Wales Legislative Assembly
People from Goulburn
Deaths from cancer in New South Wales
Politicians from Melbourne
Australian politicians with disabilities
Liberal Party of Australia members of the Parliament of New South Wales
21st-century Australian politicians
20th-century Australian politicians